Haplothrix pulcher is a species of beetle in the family Cerambycidae. It was described by Karl-Ernst Hüdepohl in 1998.

Its type locality is the Crocker Range in Sabah, East Malaysia.

References

Lamiini
Beetles described in 1998
Insects of Borneo
Insects of Malaysia